John Hay (1838–1905) was an American politician; Secretary of State 1898–1905.

John Hay may also refer to:

John Hay, 1st Lord Hay of Yester (c. 1450–c. 1508)
John Hay, 2nd Lord Hay of Yester (died 1513), Scottish nobleman
John Hay (Jesuit) (1546–1608), Jesuit scholar and educator
John Hay, 1st Earl of Tweeddale (1593–1653), Scottish aristocrat
John Hay, 1st Marquess of Tweeddale (1625–1697), Lord Chancellor of Scotland
John Hay, 2nd Marquess of Tweeddale (1645–1713), Scottish nobleman
John Hay, 4th Marquess of Tweeddale (1695–1762), Scottish nobleman
John Hay, 12th Earl of Erroll (died 1704), Scottish nobleman
John Hay of Cromlix (1691–1740), Jacobite noble
John Hay (moderator) (1566–1627), Scottish minister 
John Hay (academic) (1942–2016), Australian academic
John Hay (Canadian politician) (1862–1925), Canadian politician
John Hay (cardiologist) (1873–1959), Liverpool physician
John Hay (director) (born 1964), English film director
John Hay (footballer) (fl. 1921–1922), Scottish footballer (Bradford City)
John Hay (Henley MP) (1919–1998), British Conservative Party politician, Member of Parliament
John Hay (nature writer) (1915–2011), American author
John Hay (New South Wales politician) (1816–1892), Australian politician from New South Wales
John B. Hay (1834–1916), American politician from Illinois
John H. Hay (1917–1995), U.S. Army general
John Hay Drummond Hay (1816–1893), British diplomat
John Le Hay (1854–1926), Irish-born singer and actor
John MacDougall Hay (1879–1919), Scottish novelist
John Primrose Hay (1878–1949), British Member of Parliament for Glasgow Cathcart, 1922–1923
Sir John Hay, 6th Baronet (1788–1838), British baronet and Member of Parliament
Sir John Hay of Alderston, 1st Baronet (died 1706)
Sir John Hay of Lands and Barra, "The Incendiary" (1578-1654) Lord Provost of Edinburgh 1637–38
Sir John Dalrymple-Hay, 3rd Baronet (1821–1912), British admiral and Conservative Member of Parliament
John Hay (priest) (born 1945), Dean of Raphoe from 2003 to 2013
SS John Hay, a Liberty ship

See also
Lord John Hay (disambiguation)
John Hays (disambiguation)
Jonathan Hay (disambiguation)